Fabrice Saint-Jean (born 21 November 1980) is a retired French high jumper.

He won the bronze medal at the 2001 European U23 Championships. He took additional bronze medals at the regional events 2009 Jeux de la Francophonie and the 2013 Mediterranean Games, and also a seventh place at the 2013 Jeux de la Francophonie.

Saint-Jean also competed at the 2012 European Championships without reaching the final. His personal best is 2.28 metres, achieved in June 2012 in Geneva.

References

1980 births
Living people
French male high jumpers
Mediterranean Games bronze medalists for France
Mediterranean Games medalists in athletics
Athletes (track and field) at the 2013 Mediterranean Games
21st-century French people